Chaplain (Major General) Roy H. Parker, USA (May 15, 1890 – January 15, 1970) was an American Army officer who served as the 7th Chief of Chaplains of the United States Army from 1949 to 1952.

References

1890 births
1970 deaths
United States Army generals
Chiefs of Chaplains of the United States Army
Burials at Arlington National Cemetery
Korean War chaplains
Recipients of the Legion of Merit
20th-century American clergy